Gymnocheta viridis is a metallic green tachinid fly found throughout Europe, mainly in springtime.

References

Diptera of Europe
Tachininae
Insects described in 1810
Taxa named by Carl Fredrik Fallén